Saint Juan may refer to:

People 
Saint Juan Capistrano (1386–1456), born Giovanni da Capistrano, Franciscan priest, theologian, and inquisitor from Italy, known as the "Soldier Saint"
John of Avila (1500–1569), also known as Saint John of Avila, Spanish apostolic preacher, author, mystic and saint, canonized in 1970
Saint Juan de la Cruz (1542–1591), born Juan de Yepes Alvarez, a major figure of the Catholic Reformation in Spain
Saint Juan de Ribera (1532–1611), patriarch of Antioch, Commander in Chief, president of the Audiencia, and Chancellor of the University of Valencia
Saint John of Sahagún (1419–1479), also known as Saint John of San Facondo, confessor, celebrated Spanish preacher
Saint Juan Diego (1474–1548), indigenous Mexican who reported a Marian apparition
Saint Juan Macias (1585–1645), born Juan de Arcas Sanchez, also known as Saint John de Massias, Spanish Dominican laybrother who evangelized in Peru

Places 
Saint-Juan, a city in the department of Doubs, France

See also
Saint-Jean (disambiguation)
Saint John (disambiguation)
Sant Joan (disambiguation)
San Giovanni (disambiguation)
San Juan (disambiguation)
São João (disambiguation)
St. Johann (disambiguation)

Juan